The individual dressage at the 1928 Summer Olympics took place at Hilversum. The test was the same as for the 1924 Olympics, but the 10-minute limit was now raised to 13 minutes, giving the riders much needed time to complete it without losing points for going over the time allowed. Judging created controversy, both due to nationalistic tendencies by judges and the fact that individual judges had differing opinions on what was correct. While there was discussion on how to make it more fair—including dropping the lowest and highest scores, only having one judge from a neutral county, and removing 20 points from each score given to a countryman of each judge—no changes were made until after the judging scandal at the 1956 Games.

Scores from the individual competition were summed to give results in the team competition.

Results
Source: Official results; De Wael

References

Equestrian at the 1928 Summer Olympics